Puran Bahadur Thapa (born 1928) is an Indian footballer who played for the India national team and represented Gorkha Brigade and Services in domestic tournaments. He scored a hat-trick for the national team in a 3–1 win against Pakistan in the 1954 Colombo Cup at the Eden Gardens. It was the first hat-trick by an Indian footballer in international football on Indian soil.

Honours

India
 Colombo Cup: 1954

References 

1928 births
Indian footballers
India international footballers
Footballers from Meghalaya
People from Shillong
Indian Gorkhas
Association football midfielders
Living people